A list of parliamentary opposition leaders in the Legislative Assembly of Manitoba, Canada, from 1870 to the present.

William Alexander Macdonald was the first officially recognized leader of the Opposition in Manitoba although Rodmond Roblin is considered to have been the de facto opposition leader from 1890 until he lost his seat in the 1892 provincial election.

Note:  This list is incomplete; there are gaps between some leaders.

References 
 

Manitoba
Politics of Manitoba
Leaders of the Opposition
Manitoba politics-related lists